Aminul Islam (born 4 September 1975) is an Indian politician who is the current General Secretary & Chief Spokesperson of All India United Democratic Front from 2 October 2005. He was elected to the Assam Legislative Assembly from Mankachar in the 2021 Assam Legislative Assembly election as a member of the All India United Democratic Front political party.

References

External links
 
 

Assam politicians
1975 births
Living people
People from Dhubri district
Members of the Assam Legislative Assembly
All India United Democratic Front politicians
Bholanath College alumni
Gauhati University alumni
South Salmara-Mankachar district
Assam MLAs 2021–2026